Abdullah Suhail al-Musharrekh  (born 22 January 1979) is a football defender who plays in the UAE League. 
His particular left-back position, but it can also play and central defender. His strengths are his speed, which makes any counterattack dangerous, and his dribbling skill. He is one of the main first team players in Sharjah FC.

References

External links

1979 births
Emirati footballers
Living people
Sharjah FC players
Al Shabab Al Arabi Club Dubai players
Al Ahli Club (Dubai) players
UAE Pro League players
Association footballers not categorized by position
United Arab Emirates international footballers